Parliamentary elections were held in Bulgaria on 27 June 1971, the first held under the new Zhivkov Constitution, which had been approved in a referendum held a month earlier. The Fatherland Front, dominated by the Bulgarian Communist Party, was the only organisation to contest the election; all candidate lists had to be approved by the Front. The Front nominated one candidate for each constituency. Of the 400 candidates 268 were members of the Communist Party, 100 were members of the Bulgarian Agrarian National Union and the remaining 32 were unaffiliated. Voter turnout was reportedly 99.9%.

Results

References

Bulgaria
1971 in Bulgaria
Parliamentary elections in Bulgaria
One-party elections
Single-candidate elections
1971 elections in Bulgaria
June 1971 events in Europe